Rasmus Thykjær Andersson (born 1 June 1997) is a Danish ice hockey forward currently playing for Rungsted Seier Capital of the Danish Metal Ligaen.

References

External links
 

1997 births
Living people
HV71 players
Danish ice hockey forwards